Plecotini is a tribe of bats in the family Vespertilionidae. It contains several genera found throughout the Northern Hemisphere, in Eurasia, North Africa, and North America. Several genera in this tribe are known as big-eared bats or long-eared bats. It also contains the spotted bat and barbastelles.

The oldest fossil record of this group is Qinetia from the early Oligocene of Belgium.

Species 
Species in the tribe include:

 Genus Barbastella – barbastelles or barbastelle bats
 Western barbastelle, Barbastella barbastellus
 Beijing barbastelle, Barbastella beijingensis
 Caspian barbastelle, Barbastella caspica
 Eastern barbastelle or Asian barbastelle, Barbastella darjelingensis
 Arabian barbastelle, Barbastella leucomelas
 Japanese barbastelle, Barbastella pacifica
 Genus Corynorhinus – American lump-nosed bats
 Rafinesque's big-eared bat, Corynorhinus rafinesquii
 Mexican big-eared bat, Corynorhinus mexicanus
 Townsend's big-eared bat, Corynorhinus townsendii
 Genus Euderma
 Spotted bat, Euderma maculatum
 Genus Idionycteris
 Allen's big-eared bat, Idionycteris phyllotis
 Genus Otonycteris
 Desert long-eared bat, Otonycteris hemprichii
 Turkestani long-eared bat, Otonycteris leucophaea
 Genus Plecotus – lump-nosed bats
 Brown long-eared bat, Plecotus auritus
 Grey long-eared bat, Plecotus austriacus
 Ethiopian long-eared bat, Plecotus balensis
 Christie's long-eared bat, Plecotus christii
 Gaisler's long-eared bat, Plecotus gaisleri
 Himalayan long-eared bat, Plecotus homochrous
 Mediterranean long-eared bat, Plecotus kolombatovici
 Kozlov's long-eared bat, Plecotus kozlovi
 Alpine long-eared bat, Plecotus macrobullaris
 Ognev's long-eared bat Plecotus ognevi
 Japanese long-eared bat, Plecotus sacrimontis
 Sardinian long-eared bat, Plecotus sardus
 Strelkov's long-eared bat, Plecotus strelkovi
 Taiwan long-eared bat, Plecotus taivanus
 Canary long-eared bat, Plecotus teneriffae
 Turkmen long-eared bat, Plecotus turkmenicus
 Ward's long-eared bat, Plecotus wardi

Fossil species 

 †Qinetia
 †Qinetia misonnei (early Oligocene of Belgium)

References 

Mammal tribes
Vesper bats
Taxa named by John Edward Gray